Club Deportivo UDET  is a Salvadoran professional football club based in El Tránsito, San Miguel El Salvador.

History
Founded by a local tailor in 1951, the team was exclusively made up of tailors in its first years. UDET has swapped divisions over the years but never made it to the Premier Division.

During the 2004 Clausura season, UDET only managed to include 10 players in the lineup against A.D. Municipal. Municipal was given the win and UDET was threatened with demotion to the Third Division.

Honours

Domestic honours
 Segunda División Salvadorean and predecessors 
 Champions (1) : TBD
 Tercera División Salvadorean and predecessors 
 Champions:(1) : Apertura 2015

Current squad
As of:

Notable players
  Luis David Penado

Internationals who have played at UDET
 Leonel Guevara
  Elder José Figueroa

List of Coaches

References

Football clubs in El Salvador
1951 establishments in El Salvador
Association football clubs established in 1951
Works association football teams